Nava Vasantham is a 2007 Indian Telugu-language film. It is the remake of the Tamil film Punnagai Desam, both of which have Tarun in a lead role and directed by K. Shahjahan.

Plot
Ganesh (Tarun) comes from village to meet his uncle and his daughter Ammu (Priyamani). His uncle refuses to acknowledge his presence and does not want his daughter to get married with him. He meets his friends Prasad (Akash), Raja (Rohith), Vijay (Sunil) who are living in bad conditions and helps them achieve their dreams.

Cast
Tarun as Ganesh
Akash as Prasad
Rohit  as Raja
Priyamani as Anjali aka Ammu 
Sunil as Vijay
Ankita as Priya 
Kota Srinivasa Rao as House Owner
Vamsi Krishna as Rajesh
Ahuti Prasad as Anjali's father
Sana as Anjali's mother 
Sudha as Tarun's mother 
Mallikarjuna Rao
Brahmanandam

Soundtrack 
Music by S. A. Rajkumar. Two songs were reused from the original.

References 

2000s Telugu-language films
2007 films
Telugu remakes of Tamil films
Indian buddy comedy films
Indian buddy films
Films about friendship